Ender Arslan (born 13 January 1983) is a Turkish professional basketball coach and former player who played at the point guard position. He is current head coach for Çağdaş Bodrumspor of the Turkish Basketball First League (TBL).

Professional career
Arslan has played with TAU Cerámica in the Spanish ACB League, Panionios in the Greek Basketball League, Union Olimpija in the Slovenian Basketball League and with Efes Pilsen in the Turkish Basketball Super League.

On 21 June 2011, he signed a contract with Galatasaray Liv Hospital. In June 2015, he parted ways with Galatasaray. On 7 July 2015, he signed with Darüşşafaka. In July 2017, he signed with Türk Telekom.

On August 7, 2019, he has signed with Bursaspor of the Turkish Basketball Super League (BSL). Arslan signed a contract extension with the team on July 11, 2020.

On April 24, 2021, Arslan retired from professional basketball after playing his last game with Bursaspor.

National team career
Arslan was a regular member of the senior Turkish national basketball team.

Coaching career
Following retirement, he has started his coaching career by becoming assistant coach for Bahçeşehir Koleji of the Turkish Basketbol Süper Ligi (BSL).

On February 5, 2023, he signed and became head coach for Çağdaş Bodrumspor of the Turkish Basketball First League (TBL).

References

External links
 Ender Arslan at eurobasket.com
 Ender Arslan at euroleague.net
 Ender Arslan at tblstat.net

1983 births
Living people
2006 FIBA World Championship players
2010 FIBA World Championship players
2014 FIBA Basketball World Cup players
ABA League players
Anadolu Efes S.K. players
Bursaspor Basketbol players
Darüşşafaka Basketbol players
Galatasaray S.K. (men's basketball) players
KK Olimpija players
Liga ACB players
Panionios B.C. players
Point guards
Saski Baskonia players
Basketball players from Istanbul
Turkish expatriate basketball people in Greece
Turkish expatriate basketball people in Spain
Turkish expatriate sportspeople in Slovenia
Turkish men's basketball players
Türk Telekom B.K. players